Pradeep Hemsingh Jadhav (Naik) is a member of the 13th Maharashtra Legislative Assembly. He represents the Kinwat Assembly Constituency. He belongs to the Nationalist Congress Party. (NCP) In 2014, he was the sitting member of Maharashtra Legislative Assembly, belonging to the NCP then too. Jadhav has been a cotton trader based in Adilabad district. The Pradeep Hemasingh Jadhav is also popularly known as BHAYA(means a brother).

Personal life
Jadhav has three children.

References

Maharashtra MLAs 2014–2019
People from Nanded district
Nationalist Congress Party politicians from Maharashtra
People from Adilabad district
Marathi politicians
Living people
Year of birth missing (living people)